The Washington Nationals' 2007 season began with the team trying to win its first NL East title since moving to Washington.  During the offseason, the team replaced manager Frank Robinson with former Montreal Expos coach Manny Acta.  They lost several players through free agency and trades. The most notable of those are José Guillén, Ramón Ortiz, Alfonso Soriano, and José Vidro.  The Nationals signed few major league free agents. Their most experienced free agent signing was Dmitri Young. Luis Ayala, Alex Escobar, Cristian Guzmán, Nick Johnson, Michael O'Connor and John Patterson were expected to return from season-ending injuries.

After losing four starters (Liván Hernández, Tony Armas, Ramón Ortiz and Pedro Astacio) from the prior year, the Nationals invited an extraordinary 36 pitchers to spring training. By year's end, the team would become the first team in modern baseball (except for strike-shortened seasons) with no pitcher in double figures with wins or losses.

The season was notable for it being the Nationals final year at RFK Stadium and for Dmitri Young winning Major League Baseball Comeback Player of the Year Award, marking the team's first annual award since moving to D.C. The Nationals finished 73-89, 16 games behind the Philadelphia Phillies and fourth in the NL East. This was their only season in Washington prior to 2011 that the Nationals did not finish last in their division.

Offseason
On December 18, 2006, the Nationals traded José Vidro and cash to the Seattle Mariners for Emiliano Fruto and Chris Snelling.

Advertising and marketing
The 2007 season saw the Nationals′ first strategic marketing campaign since Lerner Enterprises purchased the team. It emphasized the upcoming opening of Nationals Park planned for 2008. The marketing slogan for the 2007 season was "Pledge Your Allegiance," a reference to the Pledge of Allegiance of the United States encouraging Nationals fans to show their loyalty to the team.

Spring training
The Nationals held their 2007 spring training in Viera, Florida, with home games played at Space Coast Stadium. They invited Danny Ardoin to spring training, but he did not make the team; they traded him to the Houston Astros for minor-leaguer Wade Robinson on March 26, 2007.

Regular season

April
On Opening Day, the Nationals lost their starting shortstop (Cristian Guzmán, hamstring) and center fielder (Nook Logan) for five weeks.  At the end of April, one of their starters, Jerome Williams hurt his ankle while batting and was placed on the 15-day disabled list.

May
Hitting coach Mitchell Page left his post with the team in May due to a relapse of alcoholism.

In the space of just 10 days in May, Shawn Hill, John Patterson, and Jason Bergmann went on the disabled list. Jerome Williams returned, pitched one game, and went back on the DL with a shoulder injury.  The Washington Post wrote: "Almost everything that could sink a team's attitude has befallen the Nats. They started the year 1-8, then they lost eight in a row to drop to 9-25."

They pressed journeymen Mike Bacsik, Micah Bowie (a relief pitcher) and Jason Simontacchi, along with rookie reliever Levale Speigner into the starting rotation, amidst predictions that the 2007 Nationals might equal the 1962 Mets' record of futility, 120 losses in one season.

After the team lost 8 straight games to sink to 9-25, the Nats won 11 of 15, mostly with patchwork starting pitching and timely hitting. and the return of Cristian Guzmán, who was hitting .343 by the end of May.

June
In June, the Nationals have been led by key hits by Dmitri Young, Cristian Guzmán and the power hitting of Ryan Zimmerman.  But towards the end of the month, Guzman, hitting .329, was injured and lost for the season, and, following the injury, the Nationals lost 9 of their next 11 games.

July
Dmitri Young, hitting .339 (third in the league) and slugging .512, was selected as the lone Nationals' representative in the 2007 Major League Baseball All-Star Game. Despite rumors that the Nationals were seeking to trade Ronnie Belliard, Chad Cordero, Jon Rauch and Young, the Nationals did not make any major trades before the non-waiver trade deadline.

Season standings

National League East

Record vs. opponents

Opening Day lineup

Notable transactions 
April 13, 2007: The Nationals received minor-leaguer Brent Abernathy from the Philadelphia Phillies as part of a conditional deal.
April 20, 207: The Nationals received Manny Alexander from the San Diego Padres as part of a conditional deal.
May 2, 2007: The Nationals traded Chris Snelling to the Oakland Athletics for Ryan Langerhans. 
June 20, 2007: The Nationals sold Anastacio Martínez to the Detroit Tigers.
June 24, 2007: The Nationals traded minor-leaguer Darnell McDonald to the Minnesota Twins for Levale Speigner. The move allowed the Nationals to keep Speigner – a Rule 5 draft pick – when they outrighted him to the Triple A Columbus Clippers.
June 26, 2007: The Nationals sent minor-leaguer Jermaine Van Buren to the Oakland Athletics as part of a conditional deal.
 August 17, 2007: The Nationals traded a player to be named later to the Boston Red Sox for Wily Mo Peña and cash.
 August 21, 2007: The Nationals traded minor-leaguer Emiliano Fruto to the Arizona Diamondbacks for minor-leaguer Chris Carter, and sent Carter to the Boston Red Sox to complete the August 17, 2007, trade.
September 4, 2007: The Nationals traded Ray King to the Milwaukee Brewers for a player to be named later. The Brewers sent minor-leaguer Andrew Lefave to the Nationals on September 14, 2007, to complete the trade.

Draft
The 2007 Major League Baseball First-Year Player Draft took place on June 7 and 8. With their first pick – the sixth pick overall – the Nationals selected pitcher Ross Detwiler. Other notable players the Nationals selected were pitcher Jordan Zimmermann (second round, 67th overall), left fielder-third baseman Jake Smolinski (second round, 70th overall), third baseman Steven Souza Jr. (third round, 100th overall), catcher Derek Norris (fourth round, 130th overall), and pitcher Pat McCoy (10th round, 310th overall).

Roster

Attendance
The Nationals drew 1,943,812 fans at Robert F. Kennedy Memorial Stadium in 2007, placing them 14th in attendance for the season among the 16 National League teams.

Game log
   

|- style="background-color:#ffbbbb"
| 1 || April 2 || Marlins || 9 – 2 || Willis (1-0) || Patterson (0-1) || || 40,389 || 0-1
|- style="background-color:#ffbbbb"
| 2 || April 3 || Marlins || 9 – 3 || Olsen (1-0) || Hill (0-1) || || 20,894 || 0-2
|- style="background-color:#bbffbb"
| 3 || April 4 || Marlins || 7 – 6 || Rauch (1-0) || Julio (0-1) || || 18,835 || 1-2
|- style="background-color:#ffbbbb"
| 4 || April 5 || D-backs || 4 – 3 || González (1-0) || Bergmann (0-1) || Valverde (2) || 16,017 || 1-3
|- style="background-color:#ffbbbb"
| 5 || April 6 || D-backs || 7 – 1 || Owings (1-0) || Williams (0-1) || || 19,234 || 1-4
|- style="background-color:#ffbbbb"
| 6 || April 7 || D-backs || 7 – 1 || Webb (1-0) || Patterson (0-2) || || 16,617 || 1-5
|- style="background-color:#ffbbbb"
| 7 || April 8 || D-backs || 3 – 1 || Hernández (1-0) || Hill (0-2)  || Valverde (3) || 17,244 || 1-6
|- style="background-color:#ffbbbb"
| 8 || April 10 || @ Braves || 8 – 0 || Hudson (1-0) || Chico (0-1) || || 18,396 || 1-7
|- style="background-color:#ffbbbb"
| 9 || April 11 || @ Braves || 8 – 3 || James (2-0) || Williams (0-2) || || 15,631 || 1-8
|- style="background-color:#bbffbb"
| 10 || April 12 || @ Braves || 2 – 0 || Colomé (1-0) || Smoltz (1-1) || Cordero (1) || 23,897 || 2-8
|- style="background-color:#ffbbbb"
| 11 || April 13 || @ Mets || 3 – 2 || Heilman (1-1) || R. Wagner (0-1) || B. Wagner (3) || 47,311 || 2-9
|- style="background-color:#bbffbb"
| 12 || April 14 || @ Mets || 6 – 2 || Hill (1-2) || Hernández (1-1) ||  || 53,560 || 3-9
|- style="background-color:#bbbbbb"
| -- || April 15 || @ Mets || colspan=5|Postponed (rain)  || 3-9
|- style="background-color:#bbffbb"
| 13 || April 16 || Braves || 5 – 1 || Chico (1-1) || James (2-1) || || 16,316 || 4-9
|- style="background-color:#ffbbbb"
| 14 || April 17 || Braves || 6 – 4 || Smoltz (2-1) || Williams (0-3) || Wickman (4) || 17,791 || 4-10
|- style="background-color:#bbffbb"
| 15 || April 18 || Phillies || 5 – 4  || Speigner (1-0) || Rosario (0-1) || || 18,584 || 5-10
|- style="background-color:#ffbbbb"
| 16 || April 19 || Phillies || 4 – 2 || Moyer (2-1) || Patterson (0-3) || Gordon (3) || 18,671 || 5-11
|- style="background-color:#bbffbb"
| 17 || April 20 || @ Marlins || 6 – 5  || Colomé (2-0) || Gardner (0-1) || Rivera (1) || 16,469 || 6-11
|- style="background-color:#ffbbbb"
| 18 || April 21 || @ Marlins || 9 – 3 || Sánchez (2-0) || Chico (1-2) || || 24,107 || 6-12
|- style=""
|- style="background-color:#ffbbbb"
| 19 || April 22 || @ Marlins || 12 – 6 || Obermueller (1-0)  || Williams (0-4) || Gregg (1) || 18,443 || 6-13
|- style="background-color:#ffbbbb"
| 20 || April 24 || @ Phillies || 6 – 3 || Alfonseca (1-0) || Bowie (0-1) || Gordon (4) || 24,745 || 6-14
|- style="background-color:#ffbbbb"
| 21 || April 25 || @ Phillies || 9 – 3 || Lieber (1-0) || Patterson (0-4) || || 23,526 || 6-15
|- style="background-color:#bbffbb"
| 22 || April 26 || @ Phillies || 4 – 2 || Hill (2-2) || Hamels (2-1) || Cordero (2) || 26,572 || 7-15
|- style="background-color:#bbffbb"
| 23 || April 27 || Mets || 4 – 3 || Chico (2-2) || Pérez (2-2) || Cordero (3) || 21,662 || 8-15
|- style="background-color:#ffbbbb"
| 24 || April 28 || Mets || 6 – 2  || Sele (1-0) || Rivera (0-1) || || 29,292 || 8-16
|- style="background-color:#ffbbbb"
| 25 || April 29 || Mets || 1 – 0 || Maine (4-0) || Bergmann (0-2) || B. Wagner (4) || 27,361 || 8-17
|- style="background-color:#bbffbb"
| 26 || April 30 || @ Padres || 3 – 2 || Patterson (1-4) || Peavy (3-1) || Cordero (4) || 19,769 || 9-17

|- style="background-color:#ffbbbb"
| 27 || May 1 || @ Padres || 3 – 0 || Young (3-2) || Hill (2-3) || Hoffman (6) || 19,438 || 9-18
|- style="background-color:#ffbbbb"
| 28 || May 2 || @ Padres || 7 – 3 || Brocail (2-0) || Chico (2-3) || || 22,153 || 9-19
|- style="background-color:#ffbbbb"
| 29 || May 4 || @ Cubs || 6 – 4 || Zambrano (3-2) || Bergmann (0-3) || Dempster (6) ||  39,444 || 9-20
|- style="background-color:#ffbbbb"
| 30 || May 5 || @ Cubs || 5 – 3 || R. Hill (4-1) || Patterson (1-5) || Dempster (7) || 40,267 || 9-21
|- style="background-color:#ffbbbb"
| 31 || May 6 || @ Cubs || 4 – 3  || Dempster (1-1) || Wagner (0-2) || || 40,481 || 9-22
|- style="background-color:#ffbbbb"
| 32 || May 7 || @ Brewers || 3 – 0 || Capuano (5-0) || Chico (2-4) || F. Cordero (13) || 17,751 || 9-23
|- style="background-color:#ffbbbb"
| 33 || May 8 || @ Brewers || 6 – 4 || Bush (3-3) || Simontacchi (0-1) || F. Cordero (14) || 19,398 || 9-24
|- style="background-color:#ffbbbb"
| 34 || May 9 || @ Brewers || 3 – 1 || Turnbow (1-0) || Bowie (0-2) || F. Cordero (15) || 24,658 || 9-25
|- style="background-color:#bbffbb"
| 35 || May 11 || Marlins || 6 – 0 || Hill (3-3) || Olsen (3-3) || || 23,006 || 10-25
|- style="background-color:#bbffbb"
| 36 || May 12 || Marlins || 7 – 3 || Rauch (2-0) || Tankersley (2-1) || || 19,278 || 11-25
|- style="background-color:#bbffbb"
| 37 || May 13 || Marlins || 6 – 4 || Simontacchi (1-1) || Obermueller (1-2) || Rauch (1) || 20,486 || 12-25
|- style="background-color:#bbffbb"
| 38 || May 14 || Braves || 2 – 1 || Bergmann (1-3) || Smoltz (5-2) || Colomé (1) || 18,829 || 13-25
|- style="background-color:#ffbbbb"
| 39 || May 15 || Braves || 6 – 2 || Hudson (5-1) || Williams (0-5) || || 21,258 || 13-26
|- style="background-color:#bbffbb"
| 40 || May 16 || Braves || 6 – 4 || Traber (1-0) || Davies (1-2) || Rauch (2) || 20,329 || 14-26
|- style="background-color:#bbffbb"
| 41 || May 17 || Braves || 4 – 3 || Chico (3-4) || Paronto (2-1) || Rauch (3) || 24,631 || 15-26
|- style="background-color:#ffbbbb"
| 42 || May 18 || Orioles || 5 – 4 || Trachsel (2-3) || Simontacchi (1-2) || Ray (9) || 22,375 || 15-27
|- style="background-color:#ffbbbb"
| 43 || May 19 || Orioles || 3 – 2  || Parrish (2-0) || Abreu (0-1) || Ray (10) || 30,661 || 15-28
|- style="background-color:#bbffbb"
| 44 || May 20 || Orioles || 4 – 3 || Colomé (3-0) || Báez (0-3) || Cordero (5) || 29,281 || 16-28
|- style="background-color:#ffbbbb"
| 45 || May 21 || @ Reds || 8 – 7 || Coutlangus (2-0) || Rauch (2-1) || Weathers (9) || 15,271 || 16-29
|- style="background-color:#bbffbb"
| 46 || May 22 || @ Reds || 8 – 4 || Colomé (4-0) || Coutlangus (2-1) || || 16,732 || 17-29
|- style="background-color:#bbffbb"
| 47 || May 23 || @ Reds || 12 – 7 || Simontacchi  (2-2)  || Lohse (1-6) || || 31,971 || 18-29
|- style="background-color:#bbffbb"
| 48 || May 24 || @ Reds || 4 – 3 || Bacsik (1-0) || Belisle (4-4) || Cordero  (6) || 19,541 || 19-29
|- style="background-color:#bbffbb"
| 49 || May 25 || @ Cardinals || 5 – 4 || Bowie (1-2) || Reyes (0-8) || Cordero (7) || 43,618 || 20-29
|- style="background-color:#ffbbbb"
| 50 || May 26 || @ Cardinals || 8 – 6 || Thompson (3-1) || Speigner (1-1) || Isringhausen (13) || 44,270 || 20-30
|- style="background-color:#bbffbb"
| 51 || May 27 || @ Cardinals || 7 – 2 || Rivera (1-1) || Wainwright (4-4) || || 44,578 || 21-30
|- style="background-color:#ffbbbb"
| 52 || May 29 || Dodgers || 10 – 0 || Penny (7-1) || Simontacchi (2-3) || || 18,483 || 21-31
|- style="background-color:#ffbbbb"
| 53 || May 30 || Dodgers || 5 – 0 || Lowe (5-5) || Bacsik (1-1) || || 22,360 || 21-32
|- style="background-color:#bbffbb"
| 54 || May 31 || Dodgers || 11 – 4 || Bowie (2-2) || Hendrickson (2-3) || || 20,982 || 22-32

|- style="background-color:#bbffbb"
| 55 || June 1 || Padres || 4 – 3  || Rauch (3-1) || Meredith (2-3) || || 22,354 || 23-32
|- style="background-color:#ffbbbb"
| 56 || June 2 || Padres || 11 – 3 || Germano (4-0) || Speigner (1-2) || || 21,635 || 23-33
|- style="background-color:#ffbbbb"
| 57 || June 3 || Padres || 7 – 3 || Wells (3-3) || Simontacchi (2-4) || || 26,967 || 23-34
|- style="background-color:#ffbbbb"
| 58 || June 5 || Pirates || 7 – 6 || Chacón (2-0) || Bacsik (1-2) || Capps (2) || 19,169 || 23-35
|- style="background-color:#bbffbb"
| 59 || June 6 || Pirates || 6 – 5 || Cordero (1-0) || Torres (0-3) || || 24,755 || 24-35
|- style="background-color:#ffbbbb"
| 60 || June 7 || Pirates || 3 – 2 || Capps (3-2) || Cordero (1-1) || || 25,622 || 24-36
|- style="background-color:#bbffbb"
| 61 || June 8 || @ Twins || 8 – 5 || Simontacchi (3-4) || Silva (3-7) || Rivera (2) || 25,144 || 25-36
|- style="background-color:#bbffbb"
| 62 || June 9 || @ Twins || 3 – 1 || Speigner (2-2) || Santana (6-6) || Cordero (8) || 39,742 || 26-36
|- style="background-color:#ffbbbb"
| 63 || June 10 || @ Twins || 6 – 3 || Bonser (5-2) || Bacsik (1-3) || Nathan (14) || 31,035 || 26-37
|- style="background-color:#bbffbb"
| 64 || June 12 || @ Orioles || 7 – 4 || Bowie (3-2) || Cabrera (5-7) || Cordero (9) || 21,151 || 27-37
|- style="background-color:#bbffbb"
| 65 || June 13 || @ Orioles || 9 – 6  || Traber (2-0) || Ray (3-5) || Rivera (3) || 21,782 || 28-37
|- style="background-color:#bbffbb"
| 66 || June 14 || @ Orioles || 3 – 1 || Simontacchi (4-4) || Bradford (0-3) || Cordero (10) || 20,770 || 29-37
|- style="background-color:#ffbbbb"
| 67 || June 15 || @ Blue Jays || 7 – 2 || Halladay (7-2) || Bacsik (1-4) || || 22,042 || 29-38
|- style="background-color:#ffbbbb"
| 68 || June 16 || @ Blue Jays || 7 – 3 || Marcum (4-2) || Speigner (2-3) || || 26,342 || 29-39
|- style="background-color:#bbffbb"
| 69 || June 17 || @ Blue Jays || 4 – 2 || Bowie (4-2) || Towers (6-6) || Cordero (11) || 28,867 || 30-39
|- style="background-color:#ffbbbb"
| 70 || June 18 || Tigers || 9 – 8 || Maroth (5-2) || Chico (3-5) || || 22,562 || 30-40
|- style="background-color:#ffbbbb"
| 71 || June 19 || Tigers || 15 – 1 || Durbin (6-3) || Simontacchi (4-5) || || 22,227 || 30-41
|- style="background-color:#ffbbbb"
| 72 || June 20 || Tigers || 8 – 4 || Bonderman (8-0) || Rivera (1-2) || || 26,637 || 30-42
|- style="background-color:#bbffbb"
| 73 || June 22 || Indians || 4 – 1 || Rivera (2-2) || Carmona (8-3) || Cordero (12) || 24,534 || 31-42
|- style="background-color:#ffbbbb"
| 74 || June 23 || Indians || 4 – 3 || Mastny (5-2) || Cordero (1-2) || Borowski (21) || 32,539 || 31-43
|- style="background-color:#bbffbb"
| 75 || June 24 || Indians || 3 – 1 || Simontacchi (5-5) || Westbrook (1-3) || Cordero (13) || 26,413 || 32-43
|- style="background-color:#ffbbbb"
| 76 || June 25 || @ Braves || 4 – 1 || Hudson (7-5) || Bergmann (1-4) || Wickman (13) || 25,375 || 32-44
|- style="background-color:#ffbbbb"
| 77 || June 26 || @ Braves || 6 – 2 || Carlyle (2-2) || Bacsik (1-5) || Wickman (14) || 22,508 || 32-45
|- style="background-color:#ffbbbb"
| 78 || June 27 || @ Braves || 13 – 0 || Smoltz (9-4) || Bowie (4-3) || || 29,144 || 32-46
|- style="background-color:#ffbbbb"
| 79 || June 29 || @ Pirates || 3 – 2 || Capps (4-4) || Rauch (3-2) || || 32,361 || 32-47
|- style="background-color:#ffbbbb"
| 80 || June 30 || @ Pirates || 7 – 2 || Gorzelanny (8-4) || Bergmann (1-5) || || 26,959 || 32-48

|- style="background-color:#bbffbb"
| 81 || July 1 || @ Pirates || 3 – 2 || Bacsik (2-5) || Maholm (4-11) || Cordero (14) || 19,149 || 33-48
|- style="background-color:#ffbbbb"
| 82 || July 2 || Cubs || 7 – 2 || Lilly (7-4) || Simontacchi (5-6) || || 24,015 || 33-49
|- style="background-color:#ffbbbb"
| 83 || July 3 || Cubs || 3 – 1 || Zambrano (10-6) || Redding (0-1) || Howry (3) || 30,106 || 33-50
|- style="background-color:#bbffbb"
| 84 || July 4 || Cubs || 6 – 0 || Chico (4-5) || Hill (5-6) || || 39,207 || 34-50
|- style="background-color:#ffbbbb"
| 85 || July 5 || Cubs || 4 – 2 || Ohman (1-4) || Ayala (0-1) || Howry (4) || 22,594 || 34-51
|- style="background-color:#ffbbbb"
| 86 || July 6 || Brewers || 6 – 2 || Bush (7-7) || Bacsik (2-6) || || 18,961 || 34-52
|- style="background-color:#bbffbb"
| 87 || July 7 || Brewers || 5 – 4 || Simontacchi (6-6) || Suppan (8-8) || C. Cordero (15) || 24,774 || 35-52
|- style="background-color:#bbffbb"
| 88 || July 8 || Brewers || 7 – 2 || Redding (1-1) || Capuano (5-6) || || 20,637 || 36-52
|- style=" background:#bbb;"
|colspan=9| All–Star Break (July 9–11)
|- style="background-color:#bbffbb"
| 89 || July 13 || @ Marlins || 14 – 10 || Rivera (3-2) || Willis (7-8) || || 11,438 || 37-52
|- style="background-color:#ffbbbb"
| 90 || July 14 || @ Marlins || 5 – 2 || Mitre (4-4) || Chico (4-6) || Gregg (19) || 21,012 || 37-53
|- style="background-color:#ffbbbb"
| 91 || July 15 || @ Marlins || 5 – 3 || Olsen (7-7) || Simontacchi (6-7) || Gregg (20) || 12,119 || 37-54
|- style="background-color:#bbffbb"
| 92 || July 16 || Astros || 4 – 3 || Rivera (4-2) || Williams (4-11) || Cordero (16) || 22,392 || 38-54
|- style="background-color:#ffbbbb"
| 93 || July 17 || Astros || 4 – 2 || Sampson (7-6) || Redding (1-2) || Lidge (1) || 22,362 || 38-55
|- style="background-color:#bbffbb"
| 94 || July 18 || Astros || 7 – 6 || Bergmann (2-5) || Jennings (1-6) || Cordero (17) || 27,119 || 39-55
|- style="background-color:#bbffbb"
| 95 || July 19 || Rockies || 5 – 4  || Rauch (4-2) || Hawkins (1-5) || || 20,573 || 40-55
|- style="background-color:#ffbbbb"
| 96 || July 20 || Rockies || 3 – 1 || Cook (6-6) || Traber (2-1) || Corpas (4) || 27,581 || 40-56
|- style="background-color:#bbffbb"
| 97 || July 21 || Rockies || 3 – 0 || Bacsik (3-6) || R. López (5-3) || Cordero (18) || 31,674 || 41-56
|- style="background-color:#bbffbb"
| 98 || July 22 || Rockies || 3 – 0 || Rauch (5-2) || Julio (0-3) || Cordero (19) || 21,793 || 42-56
|- style="background-color:#ffbbbb"
| 99 || July 24 || @ Phillies || 4 – 3 || Madson (2-2) || Ayala (0-2) || Alfonseca (8) || 40,110 || 42-57
|- style="background-color:#ffbbbb"
| 100 || July 25 || @ Phillies || 7 – 5  || Condrey (4-0) || Booker (0-1) || || 44,931 || 42-58
|- style="background-color:#bbffbb"
| 101 || July 26 || @ Phillies || 7 – 6 || Rauch (6-2) || Mesa (1-3) || Cordero (20) || 43,413 || 43-58
|- style="background-color:#bbffbb"
| 102 || July 27 || @ Mets || 6 – 2 || Bacsik (4-6) || Sosa (7-6) || || 51,179 || 44-58
|- style="background-color:#ffbbbb"
| 103 || July 28  || @ Mets || 3 – 1 || Hernández (7-4) || Rivera (4-3) || Wagner (24) || 51,947 || 44-59
|- style="background-color:#bbffbb"
| 104 || July 28  || @ Mets || 6 – 5 || Rauch (7-2) || Feliciano (2-2) || Cordero (21) || 46,265 || 45-59
|- style="background-color:#ffbbbb"
| 105 || July 29 || @ Mets || 5 – 0  || Maine (12-5) || Traber (2-2) || || 47,264 || 45-60
|- style="background-color:#bbffbb"
| 106 || July 31 || Reds || 6 – 3 || Chico (5-6) || Livingston (2-2) || Cordero (22) || 20,165 || 46-60

|- style="background-color:#bbffbb"
| 107 || August 1 || Reds || 7 – 2 || Lannan (1-0) || Arroyo (4-12) || || 28,944 || 47-60
|- style="background-color:#bbffbb"
| 108 || August 2 || Reds || 7 – 3 || Bacsik (5-6) || Dumatrait (0-1) || || 26,223 || 48-60
|- style="background-color:#bbffbb"
| 109 || August 3 || Cardinals || 3 – 2 || Cordero (2-2) || Franklin (4-1) || || 27,992 || 49-60
|- style="background-color:#bbffbb"
| 110 || August 4 || Cardinals || 12 – 1 || Hanrahan (1-0) || Piñeiro (1-2) || || 29,252 || 50-60
|- style="background-color:#bbffbb"
| 111 || August 5 || Cardinals || 6 – 3 || King (1-0) || Franklin (4-2) || Cordero (23) || 33,517 || 51-60
|- style="background-color:#ffbbbb"
| 112 || August 6 || @ Giants || 3 – 2  || Hennessey (2-3) || King (1-1) || || 43,052 || 51-61
|- style="background-color:#bbffbb"
| 113 || August 7 || @ Giants || 8 – 6 || Schroder (1-0) || Correia (1-6) || Cordero (24) || 43,154 || 52-61
|- style="background-color:#ffbbbb"
| 114 || August 8 || @ Giants || 5 – 0 || Cain (4-12) || Redding (1-3) || || 42,991 || 52-62
|- style="background-color:#bbffbb"
| 115 || August 9 || @ Giants || 3 – 1 || Hanrahan (2-0) || Misch (0-2) || Cordero (25) || 41,555 || 53-62
|- style="background-color:#ffbbbb"
| 116 || August 10 || @ D-backs || 11 – 4 || Hernández (8-7) || Rivera (4-4) || || 31,110 || 53-63
|- style="background-color:#ffbbbb"
| 117 || August 11 || @ D-backs || 1 – 0 || Webb (12-8) || Lannan (1-1) || || 32,121 || 53-64
|- style="background-color:#bbffbb"
| 118 || August 12 || @ D-backs || 7 – 6 || Rauch (8-2) || Valverde (1-4) || Cordero (26) || 29,839 || 54-64
|- style="background-color:#ffbbbb"
| 119 || August 14 || Phillies || 3 – 2 || Alfonseca (4-1) || Rauch (8-3) || Myers (10) || 27,128 || 54-65
|- style="background-color:#bbffbb"
| 120 || August 15 || Phillies || 4 – 2 || Redding (2-3) || Kendrick (5-3) || Cordero (27) || 25,575 || 55-65
|- style="background-color:#ffbbbb"
| 121 || August 16 || Phillies || 4 – 2 || Hamels (14-5) || Hanrahan (2-1) || Myers (11) || 27,308 || 55-66
|- style="background-color:#ffbbbb"
| 122 || August 17 || Mets || 6 – 2 || Glavine (11-6) || Chico (5-7) || || 23,636 || 55-67
|- style="background-color:#ffbbbb"
| 123 || August 18 || Mets || 7 – 4 || Pérez (11-8) || Lannan (1-2) || Wagner (29) || 35,157 || 55-68
|- style="background-color:#ffbbbb"
| 124 || August 19 || Mets || 8 – 2 || Hernández (8-4) || Rauch (8-4) || || 29,092 || 55-69
|- style="background-color:#bbffbb"
| 125 || August 20 || @ Astros || 7 – 0 || Redding (3-3) || Jennings (2-9) || || 30,374 || 56-69
|- style="background-color:#bbffbb"
| 126 || August 21 || @ Astros || 11 – 6 || Hanrahan (3-1) || Rodríguez (7-12) || || 34,073 || 57-69
|- style="background-color:#ffbbbb"
| 127 || August 22 || @ Astros || 3 – 2 || Williams (8-12) || Bacsik (5-7) || Lidge (12) || 32,023 || 57-70
|- style="background-color:#bbffbb"
| 128 || August 23 || @ Astros || 7 – 6 || Lannan (2-2) || Gutiérrez (0-1) || Cordero (28) || 36,407 || 58-70
|- style="background-color:#ffbbbb"
| 129 || August 24 || @ Rockies || 6 – 5 || Fuentes (1-5) || Cordero (2-3) || || 25,232 || 58-71
|- style="background-color:#ffbbbb"
| 130 || August 25 || @ Rockies || 5 – 1 || U. Jiménez (3-2) || Redding (3-4) || || 27,179 || 58-72
|- style="background-color:#ffbbbb"
| 131 || August 26 || @ Rockies || 10 – 5 || Dessens (2-1) || Hanrahan (3-2) || || 24,086 || 58-73
|- style="background-color:#ffbbbb"
| 132 || August 27 || @ Dodgers || 5 – 4 || Lowe (11-11) || Bacsik (5-8) || Saito (35) || 46,944 || 58-74
|- style="background-color:#ffbbbb"
| 133 || August 28 || @ Dodgers || 4 – 3 || Billingsley (9-4) || Schroder (1-1) || Saito (36) || 49,698 || 58-75
|- style="background-color:#ffbbbb"
| 134 || August 29 || @ Dodgers || 10 – 9  || Proctor (5-5) || Rivera (4-5) || || 41,913 || 58-76
|- style="background-color:#ffbbbb"
| 135 || August 31 || Giants || 3 – 2 || Correia (3-6) || Redding (3-5) || Hennessey (17) || 25,169 || 58-77

|- style="background-color:#bbffbb"
| 136 || September 1 || Giants || 4 – 1 || Hanrahan (4-2) || Sánchez (1-3) || Cordero (29) || 30,221 || 59-77
|- style="background-color:#bbffbb"
| 137 || September 2 || Giants || 2 – 1 || Cordero (3-3) || Wilson (1-1) || || 27,310 || 60-77
|- style="background-color:#bbffbb"
| 138 || September 3 || Marlins || 6 – 3 || Bergmann (3-5) || VandenHurk (4-5) || Cordero (30) || 27,592 || 61-77
|- style="background-color:#bbffbb"
| 139 || September 4 || Marlins || 4 – 3 || Schroder (2-1) || Gregg (0-5) || || 15,611 || 62-77
|- style="background-color:#bbffbb"
| 140 || September 5 || Marlins || 6 – 4 || Ayala (1-2) || Lindstrom (2-4) || Cordero (31) || 19,222 || 63-77
|- style="background-color:#ffbbbb"
| 141 || September 7 || @ Braves || 7 – 1 || Smoltz (13-7) || Hanrahan (4-2) || || 31,116 || 63-78
|- style="background-color:#ffbbbb"
| 142 || September 8 || @ Braves || 9 – 2 || James (10-10) || Chico (5-8) || || 36,940 || 63-79
|- style="background-color:#bbffbb"
| 143 || September 9 || @ Braves || 7 – 4 || Bergmann (4-5) || Cormier (2-5) || Cordero (32) || 31,582 || 64-79
|- style="background-color:#bbffbb"
| 144 || September 10 || @ Marlins || 5 – 4 || Hill (4-3) || Olsen (9-13) || Cordero (33) || 12,345 || 65-79
|- style="background-color:#ffbbbb"
| 145 || September 11 || @ Marlins || 13 – 8 || Lindstrom (3-4) || Schroder (2-2) || || 11,078 || 65-80
|- style="background-color:#ffbbbb"
| 146 || September 12 || @ Marlins || 5 – 4  || Barone (1-2) || Rivera (4-6) || || 10,121 || 65-81
|- style="background-color:#ffbbbb"
| 147 || September 14 || Braves || 8 – 5  || Ascanio (1-1) || Colomé (4-1) || || 18,568 || 65-82
|- style="background-color:#bbffbb"
| 148 || September 15 || Braves || 7 – 4 || Bergmann (5-5) || Cormier (2-6) || Cordero (34) || 26,866 || 66-82
|- style="background-color:#ffbbbb"
| 149 || September 16 || Braves || 3 – 0 || Hudson (16-8) || Hill (4-4) || || 23,935 || 66-83
|- style="background-color:#bbffbb"
| 150 || September 17 || Mets || 12 – 4 || Albaladejo (1-0) || Sele (3-2) || || 18,678 || 67-83
|- style="background-color:#bbffbb"
| 151 || September 18 || Mets || 9 – 8 || Colomé (5-1) || Maine (14-10) || Cordero (35) || 19,966 || 68-83
|- style="background-color:#ffbbbb"
| 152 || September 19 || Mets || 8 – 4 || Pelfrey (3-7) || Chico (5-9) || || 20,558 || 68-84
|- style="background-color:#ffbbbb"
| 153 || September 20 || Phillies || 7 – 6 || Romero (2-2) || Albaladejo (1-1) || Myers (18) || 19,966 || 68-85
|- style="background-color:#ffbbbb"
| 154 || September 21 || Phillies || 6 – 3 || Eaton (10-9) || Hill (4-5) || Myers (19) || 26,949 || 68-86
|- style="background-color:#ffbbbb"
| 155 || September 22 || Phillies || 4 – 1  || Myers (5-7) || Schroder (2-3) || Condrey (2) || 26,412 || 68-87
|- style="background-color:#bbffbb"
| 156 || September 23 || Phillies || 5 – 3 || Ayala (2-2) || Alfonseca (5-2) || Cordero (36) || 40,519 || 69-87
|- style="background-color:#bbffbb"
| 157 || September 24 || @ Mets || 13 – 4 || Chico (6-9) || Pelfrey (3-8) || || 49,164 || 70-87
|- style="background-color:#bbffbb"
| 158 || September 25 || @ Mets || 10 – 9 || Bergmann (6-5) || Glavine (13-7) || Rauch (4) || 49,244 || 71-87
|- style="background-color:#bbffbb"
| 159 || September 26 || @ Mets || 9 – 6 || Hanrahan (5-3) || Smith (3-2) || Ayala (1) || 51,940 || 72-87
|- style="background-color:#ffbbbb"
| 160 || September 28 || @ Phillies || 6 – 0 || Hamels (15-5) || Redding (3-6) || || 45,084 || 72-88
|- style="background-color:#bbffbb"
| 161 || September 29 || @ Phillies || 4 – 2 || Chico (7-9) || Eaton (10-10) || Cordero (37) || 44,532 || 73-88
|- style="background-color:#ffbbbb"
| 162 || September 30 || @ Phillies || 6 – 1 || Moyer (14-12) || Bergmann (6-6) || || 44,865 || 73-89

Player stats

Batting
Note: Pos = Position; G = Games played; AB = At bats; R = Runs scored; H = Hits; 2B = Doubles; 3B = Triples; HR = Home runs; RBI = Runs batted in; AVG = Batting average; SB = Stolen bases

Complete offensive statistics are available here.

Pitching
Note: Pos = Position; W = Wins; L = Losses; ERA = Earned run average; G = Games pitched; GS = Games started; SV = Saves; IP = Innings pitched; R = Runs allowed; ER = Earned runs allowed; BB = Walks allowed; K = Strikeouts

Complete pitching statistics are available here.

Team leaders

Qualifying players only.

Batting

Pitching

Awards and honors

All-Stars
 Dmitri Young, 1B

Annual awards
 National League Comeback Player of the Year: Dmitri Young

Records and firsts
The 2007 Nationals became the first team in modern baseball (1901–present) to trail 4-0 in each of their first six games. as well as the first to not score during the first three innings of each of their first ten games.

The 2007 Nationals also set the National League record for not scoring a run in the first inning of their first 22 games.

On August 7, 2007, in a game against the San Francisco Giants at AT&T Park, Nationals pitcher Mike Bacsik gave up career home run number 756 to Barry Bonds, who broke a 33-year-old record previously held by Hank Aaron.

Farm system

References

Game Logs:
1st Half: Washington Nationals Game Log on ESPN.com
2nd Half: Washington Nationals Game Log on ESPN.com
Batting Statistics: Washington Nationals Batting Stats on ESPN.com
Pitching Statistics: Washington Nationals Pitching Stats on ESPN.com

2007 Washington Nationals at Baseball Reference

Washington Nationals seasons
Washington Nationals season
Washington Nationals